Sutton is a locality in the Strath Taieri, in the southern part of the South Island, New Zealand. It is located on SH 87 close to the point where it is met by the Taieri Gorge rail line, some 5 kilometres to the south of Middlemarch. New Zealand's only salt lake, the Sutton Salt Lake, lies 10 kilometres to the west. Sutton is the location of the Orchard Sun Club, Dunedin's only landed naturist club.

Populated places in Otago